The 2017 Piala Belia is the seventh season of the Piala Belia since its establishment in 2008. The league is currently the youth level (U19) football league in Malaysia. Bukit Jalil Sports School are the defending champions.

Teams
The following teams will be participate in the 2017 Piala Belia. In order by the number given by FAM:-

  Johor Darul Ta'zim IV
  Kedah U19
  Kelantan U19
  Felda United U19
  Kuala Lumpur U19
  Melaka United U19
  Negeri Sembilan U19
  Pahang U19
  Perak U19
  Perlis U19
  Penang U19
  Sabah U19
  Sarawak U19
  Sekolah Sukan Tunku Mahkota Ismail U17
  Sekolah Sukan Tunku Mahkota Ismail U16
  Sekolah Sukan Malaysia Pahang
  PKNS U19
  Selangor U19
  Terengganu U19

Team summaries

Personnel and kits
Note: Flags indicate national team as has been defined under FIFA eligibility rules. Players and Managers may hold more than one non-FIFA nationality.

League table

Group A

Group B

Result table

Group A

Group B

Knock-out stage

Bracket

Quarterfinals
The first legs were played on 20 September, and the second legs were played on 25 September 2017.
|-

First Leg

Second Leg

SSMP U17 won 2–1 on aggregate.

First Leg

Second Leg

SSTMI U17 won 4–2 on aggregate.

First Leg

Second Leg

Terengganu U19 won 3–2 on aggregate.

First Leg

Second Leg

Kedah U19 won 3–1 on aggregate.

Semifinals
The first legs will be played on 30 September, and the second legs will be played on 5 October 2017.
|-

First Leg

Second Leg

SSMP won 7–0 on aggregate.

First Leg

Second Leg

3–3 on aggregate. Kedah won on away goals.

Final

First Leg

Second Leg

3–3 on aggregate. Kedah won on away goals.

Champions

Season statistics

Scoring

See also

 2017 Liga Super
 2017 Liga Premier
 2017 Malaysia FAM League
 2017 Piala FA
 2017 Piala Presiden

References

External links
 Football Association of Malaysia
 SPMB 

2017 in Malaysian football
Piala Belia